Trevor Tanner  is a British musician and composer, best known as the singer and guitarist of post-punk/gothic rock band the Bolshoi during the 1980s. He now has a solo career via Emperor Penguin Recordings.

Post-Bolshoi career

Trevor Tanner, working closely with Emperor Penguin Recordings' (EPR) Creative Director David Paul Wyatt Perko, has been slowly releasing solo recordings. Tanner's first release on Emperor Penguin Recordings was an elaborate 3-CD boxed-set (the three volumes are also available individually) entitled Bullish, Bellyache & Belch, which was released in 2004. The set consists of 41 songs in total, which were hand-picked by Perko out of a pool of well over a hundred Tanner works-in-progress.

Tanner's fourth release on Emperor Penguin Recordings, a 16-track work entitled Eaten by the Sea, became available for digital download on iTunes on 11 March 2008. The CD was released on 20 May 2008.

Trevor Tanner, via Emperor Penguin Recordings, released an iTunes Digital 45, entitled The Ballad of Edgar Allan Poe on 13 July 2011.

On 31 August 2011, Tanner's fifth solo album, Musical Charlatan became available. Musical Charlatan was a grassroots, self-release and not associated with Emperor Penguin Recordings.

After the release of the Bolshoi's Lindy's Party, the Bolshoi recorded a fourth album, but problems with their record label management impeded its release, and they disbanded as the 1980s drew to a close. The previously unreleased fourth album, titled Country Life, had been lost for years but has now been resurrected by Beggars Banquet with extensive help from Tanner's current record label-head and Creative Director, David Paul Wyatt Perko. This new release is now available as one of five CDs in Beggar's 5-CD box set, put out via Beggar's imprint, The Arkive.

Tanner then began working on a follow-up to Beggar's 5-CD box set, creating an all-acoustic project titled Trevor Tanner's the Bolshoi Favourites No. 1, which was released on CD and double vinyl by Tanner's label, Emperor Penguin Recordings' (EPR), on 6 September 2016.

He is currently working on a new project with the keyboardist from The Bolshoi, Paul Clark, tentatively titled, The Bolshoi Brothers.

Discography
 Bullish, Bellyache & Belch (3-CD boxed set) (2004)
 Eaten by the Sea (CD) (2008)
 The Ballad of Edgar Allan Poe (iTunes, digital 45) (2011)
 Musical Charlatan (Double-CD) (2011)
 Trevor Tanner's the Bolshoi Favourites No. 1 (CD + double vinyl) (2016)

External links
 
 Emperor Penguin Recordings
 The Bolshoi Brothers

Living people
English rock guitarists
English male guitarists
English male singers
English new wave musicians
British post-punk musicians
Gothic rock musicians
1962 births